Howard Starks (born December 25, 1944) was a Canadian football player who played for the Calgary Stampeders and Montreal Alouettes. He won the Grey Cup with Calgary in 1971. He played college football at Wichita State University.

References

1944 births
Living people
Montreal Alouettes players
Calgary Stampeders players
Wichita State Shockers football players
American football running backs
Canadian football running backs